Ulpu Iivari (born 20 March 1948 in Salla) is a Finnish Social-Democrat politician and former Member of the European Parliament (MEP). A journalist by education, Iivari began her political career as a representative in the Finnish Parliament for one term from 1991 to 1995, when she moved into the European Parliament.

Iivari did not win a seat at the 2004 election. She withdrew from politics and currently works as a consultant in the communications industry.

References

1948 births
Living people
People from Salla
Social Democratic Party of Finland politicians
Members of the Parliament of Finland (1991–95)
Social Democratic Party of Finland MEPs
MEPs for Finland 1996–1999
MEPs for Finland 1999–2004
20th-century women MEPs for Finland
21st-century women MEPs for Finland
Women members of the Parliament of Finland